Sirp (English 'sickle') is a newspaper published in Estonia. It mostly publishes articles on culture: art, literature, music, film, theatre, and architecture; also articles on sciences and social issues. From 1994 to 1997 the newspaper was issued under the name Kultuurileht.

References

Newspapers published in Estonia
Mass media in Tallinn